Clepsis canariensis is a species of moth of the family Tortricidae. It is found on the Canary Islands.

References

Moths described in 1896
Clepsis